Alyaksandr Skshynetski (born 28 February 1990) is a Belarusian professional footballer who plays for Arsenal Dzerzhinsk.

Honours
MTZ-RIPO Minsk
Belarusian Cup winner: 2007–08

External links

1990 births
Living people
People from Karelichy
Sportspeople from Grodno Region
Belarusian footballers
Association football defenders
FC Partizan Minsk players
FC Smorgon players
FC Isloch Minsk Raion players
FC Krumkachy Minsk players
FC Smolevichi players
FC Arsenal Dzerzhinsk players